Antoine Griezmann: The Making of a Legend is a 2019 documentary film directed by Alex Dell, following Antoine Griezmann's path from Real Sociedad in Spain, to Atletico Madrid, and all the way to winning the FIFA World Cup with France in 2018. It was released on Netflix on March 21, 2019.

Premise
Antoine Griezmann: The Making of a Legend covers the ups and downs of modern professional football, through archival footage and interviews with Antoine and his father. It's the tale of a boy who didn't seem to have the physical attributes necessary for the game, a game that has become increasingly physical and fast-paced, but proved skeptics wrong. We see the struggle to get signed at an early age as well as the hundreds of failed tryouts along the way, until getting a breakthrough at Real Sociedad.

Release
The documentary was released on March 21, 2019 on Netflix streaming.

References

External links

 
 
 

2019 documentary films
2019 films
Netflix original documentary films
Documentary films about association football
2010s English-language films